Vitalii Doroshenko (born 12 December 1994) is a Ukrainian-Portuguese footballer who plays for Dragões Sandinenses.

Club career
Born in Kherson, in Ukraine, Doroshenko started his career in Portugal, playing for many clubs during his youth career between 2005 and 2013. Notable among the clubs was Porto. In 2013, he signed for Doxa Katokopias in Cypriot First Division. He made his debut against AEL Limassol, coming as an 86th-minute substitute for Carlitos. He scored a brace in a Cypriot Cup match against Olympiakos Nicosia. In 2015, he moved to Olympiakos Nicosia for 6 months.

Club statistics

References

External links

 

1994 births
Living people
Sportspeople from Kherson
Association football forwards
Ukrainian footballers
Doxa Katokopias FC players
Olympiakos Nicosia players
S.C. Dragões Sandinenses players
Cypriot First Division players
Cypriot Second Division players
Ukrainian expatriate footballers
Expatriate footballers in Cyprus